Trenbolone enanthate, known by the nickname Trenabol, is a synthetic and injected anabolic–androgenic steroid (AAS) and a derivative of nandrolone which was never marketed. It is the C17β enanthate ester and a long-acting prodrug of trenbolone. Trenbolone enanthate was never approved for medical or veterinary use but is used in scientific research and has been sold on the internet black market as a designer steroid for bodybuilders and athletes.

See also
 List of androgen esters § Trenbolone esters

References

Further reading
 

Abandoned drugs
Androgen esters
Androgens and anabolic steroids
Enanthate esters
Estranes
Ketones
Prodrugs
Progestogens
World Anti-Doping Agency prohibited substances